The wine lake refers to a perceived overproduction of wine in the European Union, particularly around 2005–2007. The EU's Common Agricultural Policy contained a number of subsidies for wine producers, leading to a supply glut; this surplus forced an overhaul of EU farm policies. In 2007 it was reported that for the previous several vintages, European countries had been producing 1.7 billion more bottles of wine than they sold. Hundreds of millions of bottles of wine had been turned into industrial alcohol every year, a practice that had sometimes been described as "emergency distillation", at a cost to taxpayers of €500 million per year. A major contributor was reported to be Languedoc-Roussillon wine production, which used one third of the grapes grown in France.

One proposed remedy was Plan Bordeaux: an initiative introduced in 2005 by the French vintners association ONIVINS designed to reduce France's production and raise prices. The proposed plan was met with some resistance.

In 2020, wine growers warned that the EU risked another massive surplus due to the effects of the COVID-19 pandemic, particularly the restaurant closures. The growers called for additional subsidies to distill surplus wine.

See also
 Butter mountain
 Crop destruction

References

Further reading
 

Economy of the European Union
European Union and agriculture
Wine terminology
Alcohol in Europe